Taka Borja (born 20 November 2003) is a Northern Mariana Islands footballer who currently plays Teen Ayuyu and the Northern Mariana Islands national team.

Youth career
In 2015 Borja competed with Tan Holdings in a youth tournament in Guam. In the tournament he scored in a 2–4 defeat to Guam Shipyard FC. That year he also took an early lead in the under-12 division top scorer race. The following season he scored fifteen goals to secure the Golden Boot award as the top scorer for the under-14 league. As a youth he also played futsal and was the captain of Bedte FC.

By 2021 Borja had joined Teen Ayuyu and was playing with the senior squad in the Marianas Soccer League.

International career
Borja represented the Northern Mariana Islands in 2018 AFC U-16 Championship qualification and 2020 AFC U-19 Championship qualification. In 2018, he was named to the youth national team again for the East Asian Football Federation U15 Tournament in Xianghe, China and the Tuloy XO Cup held in the Philippines. He served as captain of the team during its time in China.

Borja made his senior international debut on 19 February 2022 in a friendly against Guam. Three days later he scored his first senior international goal in the second match of the series.

International goals
Scores and results list Northern Mariana Islands' goal tally first.

International career statistics

References

External links

2003 births
Living people
Association football forwards
Northern Mariana Islands footballers
Northern Mariana Islands international footballers